Namon is a village in Bassar Prefecture, Kara Region, Togo.

Namon may refer to:
 Namon Leo Daughtry (born 1940), Republican member of the North Carolina General Assembly
 Namon Washington (1894 – 1971), American baseball outfielder
 Na Mon District in Kalasin Province, Thailand

See also 
 Namong, town in the Ashanti Region of Ghana